Shawn Stuckey a/k/a Shawn D. Stuckey, a/k/a Shawn Demetrices Stuckey is a former professional athlete and professional football player. Stuckey was a Linebacker with the New England Patriots (#93) of the NFL, the Minnesota Vikings (#51) of the NFL, the Tampa Bay Buccaneers (#93) of the NFL, the Amsterdam Admirals of NFL Europe (#55), and the Los Angeles Xtreme of the XFL (#53).  Stuckey is an attorney licensed to practice in the states of Minnesota and California. Stuckey formerly was a complex litigation lawyer in Minneapolis, Minnesota from 2008 until 2015. He is currently a practicing attorney and senior partner representing professional athletes in Orange County, California at the law firm he founded in 2018 - Glenn, Stuckey, & Partners, LLP - www.glennstuckey.com.stuckey. Since 2016, Stuckey has been named a "Top Rated Entertainment & Sports Attorney in Santa Ana, CA" by one of the nation's leading publications - Super Lawyers.

Early life and college
Stuckey was born in Dale County, Alabama but raised in Daleville, Alabama - a small, rural town in Dale County, Alabama. Stuckey was raised in public housing by his single mother and received welfare and food stamps.  He never knew his father.

Stuckey played high school football at Daleville High School, then matriculated at Vanderbilt University, majoring in Cognitive Studies before transferring to Troy University where he majored in Marketing and Business Administration.

Professional football career
Undrafted as a rookie, he signed with the Minnesota Vikings where he was a member of the same rookie class as Randy Moss.  After being released by the Minnesota Vikings after training camp, Stuckey signed with the New England Patriots, where he made the team as a linebacker and wore jersey number 93.  He started in six games, recovered one fumble during the 1998 season, and became the only free-agent rookie to start in the NFL playoffs, against the Jacksonville Jaguars.  The fumble recovery marked the eleventh time in NFL history that an NFL rookie recovered a fumble in his very first regular season football game.Stuckey voluntarily left the Patriots at the beginning of the 1999 season to adopt his brother, who had gotten into serious criminal difficulty in Alabama.  In his online autobiography, he also indicated that his "heart wasn't in the game".  Financial concerns compelled Stuckey to re-enter professional football, and he signed with the Tampa Bay Buccaneers, who allocated him to the Amsterdam Admirals of NFL Europe.  After his season with Amsterdam, Stuckey was placed on injured reserve by Tampa Bay due to an injury sustained with the Admirals. After his recovery, Stuckey signed with the Los Angeles Xtreme of the XFL, where he played on their 2001 world-championship team. Later he played for the Indiana Firebirds of the Arena Football League before injuries forced him to give up football for good.

Stuckey attained over 21 high school, collegiate, and professional titles, including one World Championship (XFL), and also set an NFL record as the fastest linebacker in the 1998 draft.

Legal education and career
Following his football career, Shawn Stuckey attended The Citadel, where he worked on his MBA while serving as assistant coach of the college's football team.  In 2005, he matriculated at the University of St. Thomas School of Law in Minneapolis, Minnesota, where he became the recipient of numerous accolades and honors, including an award from the Minnesota Association of Black Lawyers. He published two law review articles and an American Bar Association (ABA) article.  One of his articles was honored by the Minnesota Women Lawyers as the recipient of their 2007 Equal Justice Award, which recognizes the best written law student article on a topic of equal justice.

In law school, Stuckey was co-chair of the legal department for the St. Paul Chapter of the NAACP.  He was asked to give testimony before the United Nations in Geneva in February 2008, during the 72nd Convention on the Elimination of Racial Discrimination. He was also the keynote speaker at the 4th Annual National Black Pre-Law Admissions Conference in Houston, Texas.

Since being licensed to practice in 2008, Stuckey has been awarded numerous accolades for his legal accomplishments. In 2015, 2016, 2017, 2018, 2019, 2020, & 2021, Shawn was selected to “Best Attorneys of America”, (an honor limited to only 100 attorneys in each state); “National Black Lawyers 40 Under 40”, a Super Lawyers Rising Star in Minnesota (an honor only given to the top 2.5% of attorneys in the state), and presented at the 2017 American Bar Association (ABA) Litigation Section's Annual Conference on a panel program entitled “Litigating the Concussion Crisis”.  

In 2020 and 2021, Shawn was selected as a Top 100 National Black Lawyer.

References

External links
Shawn Stuckey's Personal Website Contains biography, statistics and photographs of Mr. Stuckey.
Minnesota Women Lawyers Website of Women's legal group that honored Stuckey in 2007.
National Black Pre-Law Admissions Conference Features biography of Stuckey.

New England Patriots players
Los Angeles Xtreme players
People from Daleville, Alabama
Players of American football from Alabama
Living people
1975 births